Margaret Marty Mann (October 15, 1904 – July 22, 1980) is considered by some to be the first woman with longterm sobriety in Alcoholics Anonymous.

There were several remarkable women in the early days of AA including but not limited to: Florence R. of New York, Sylvia K. of Chicago, Ethel M. of Akron, Ohio. AA co-founder Bill Wilson was Marty's sponsor.  Marty wrote her Story(personal experience) "Women Suffer Too" in the Story Section of second through fourth editions of the Big Book of AA.

Mann organized the National Committee for Education on Alcoholism (NCEA) in 1944, which later became the National Council on Alcoholism (NCA), and then the National Council on Alcoholism and Drug Dependence (NCADD), to address concern with other drugs. She traveled across the U.S. educating medical professionals legislators, businessmen and the public to the importance of treatment and education of the fatal disease of alcoholism.
In 1976 the NCA organized Operation Understanding where 50 celebrities and professionals gathered to address the social stigma surrounding alcoholism.  Actors, politicians, sports legends, physicians, lawyers, clergy and more stood up in the hotel ballroom and said "I am an alcoholic." The NCA hoped to reduce the social stigma surrounding alcoholism and encourage individuals and their family to get treatment. Marty hoped to raise social awareness that alcoholism is not a moral weakness but a deadly disease.

Background 
Marty Mann came from an upper-middle-class family in Chicago. She attended private schools, traveled extensively, and was a debutante. Mann's father, once a top executive at the most prestigious department store in downtown Chicago, died of alcoholism.

Marty was married briefly in her 20s but was a lesbian for the rest of her life. Mann was her maiden name, and she used the Mrs. title to protect her privacy. Society's prejudice against homosexuality was as strong as it was toward alcoholism during the 1940s and 1950s when she and the National Committee for Education on Alcoholism were struggling to survive.

Mann moved to England in 1930 and fell in love with photographer Barbara Ker-Seymer.  The Tate Museum in London has photographs detailing their social circle. British photographer and society figure, considered one of the group designated by the tabloid press as 'Bright Young People'. They visited the Paris salon of Gertrude Stein and Alice B. Toklas. She also socialized with Janet Flanner, Virginia Woolf and Vita Sackville-West.

Marty worked as a magazine editor, art critic, and photojournalist for renowned magazines such as Vogue, Harpers, and Tattler. However, she had alcoholism – and it progressed to the point where she was no longer able to hold a job, drifting in and out of homelessness while living abroad in London.

Her alcoholism escalated and she spent 6 months in a London Hospital after a second suicide attempt. She was encouraged to return home to America by her friends. In 1936, she returned to her family in the United States and sought help from doctors. She quickly became a charity patient at Bellevue Hospital in New York City. She eventually transferred to Blythewood Sanitarium in Greenwich, Connecticut. In 1939, her psychiatrist Dr. Harry Tiebout gave her a pre-publication manuscript of the book Alcoholics Anonymous, and persuaded her to attend her first AA meeting. This meeting took place at the home of Lois and Bill W (co-founder of AA) at 182 Clinton Street in Brooklyn, New York.

Marty was romantically involved with Priscilla Peck for 40 years. Priscilla was an Art Editor at Vogue (magazine) for 25 years. They owned a home together in Greenwich Village in New York City, a vacation home at Cherry Grove on Fire Island (a well known gay community) and later in life they had a home in Connecticut.

Encouraging a change in viewpoint 
In 1945, Mann became inspired with the desire to eliminate the stigma and ignorance regarding alcoholism and to encourage the "disease model" which viewed it as a medical/psychological problem, not a moral failing. She helped start the Yale School of Alcohol Studies (now at Rutgers), and organized the National Committee for Education on Alcoholism (NCEA), now the National Council on Alcoholism and Drug Dependence or NCADD.

She believed alcoholism runs in the family, and education of the disease was essential.

Three ideas formed the basis of her message:

Alcoholism is a disease and the alcoholic a sick person.
The alcoholic can be helped and is worth helping.
Alcoholism is a public health problem and therefore a public responsibility.
Marty Mann and R. Brinkley Smithers funded Dr. E. Morton (Bunky) Jellinek's initial 1946 study on Alcoholism. Dr. Jellinek's study was based on a narrow, selective study of a hand-picked group of members of Alcoholics Anonymous (AA) who had returned a self-reporting questionnaire.

In the 1950s, Edward R. Murrow included her in his list of the 10 greatest living Americans. Her book New Primer on Alcoholism was published in 1958.

Legacy 
Marty Mann wrote the following books:

Primer on Alcoholism

Marty Mann's New Primer on Alcoholism

Marty Mann Answers Your Questions about Alcoholism.

Mann was instrumental in the founding of High Watch Farm, the world's first recovery center founded on the principles of Alcoholics Anonymous.

In 1980, Mann suffered a stroke at home and died soon after. Many histories of Alcoholics Anonymous make only passing mention of Mann, perhaps because NCEA had no formal relationship to AA. However, Mann's public admission of her own alcoholism, her successful experience with AA, and her encouragement of others — especially women — to get help contributed substantially to AA's growth.

Marty Mann's obituary was published in the New York Times:  "MARTY MANN DEAD; HELPED ALCOHOLICS; Founder of Alcoholism Council, 75, Wrote Books and Lectured Extensively on Drinking 'I Am an Alcoholic' (Published 1980)

References

External links 
Marty Mann's New Primer on Alcoholism, reviewed by John Philip, 
Marty Mann Papers at Syracuse University 
Marty Mann's Story Women Suffer Too, Big Book (Alcoholics Anonymous, 4th ed.) Online,
 

1904 births
1980 deaths
Writers from Chicago
Alcoholics Anonymous
American lesbian writers
LGBT people from Illinois
20th-century American women writers
20th-century American LGBT people